The RGZ-89 (Offensive Hand Grenade model 89, in Polish: Ręczny Granat Zaczepny wz. 89) is a modern Polish grenade produced in Zakłady Mechaniczne "Dezamet".

External links 
  - RGZ-89 at the producer's page

Hand grenades of Poland